Dodona adonira, the striped Punch, is a small but striking butterfly found in the Indomalayan realm that belongs to the Punches and Judies, that is, the family Riodinidae.

Description

From Charles Thomas Bingham (1905) The Fauna of British India, Including Ceylon and Burma, Butterflies, Vol. 1
Males and females have the upperside dark brownish black, forewing with the base suffused slightly with ochraceous; subbasal, discal and post-discal transverse orange bands, the subbasal straight, the other two slightly curved, sinuous and somewhat macular, the subbasal and discal bands joined posteriorly in interspace 1 a: Female with or without three or four transversely-placed upper subterminal orange-yellow spots. Hindwing: a pale yellow fascia, parallel to the dorsal margin; oblique subbasal, discal, postdiscal and inner and outer subterminal orange-yellow fasciae, all, except the post-discal, converging from the costa and meeting above the tornal lobe; the postdiscal fascia broad at costal margin, narrowing to a point-and terminating on vein 3; bilobed, the lobes margined outwardly by a very slender continuous white line, beyond which the cilia are black; the rest of the cilia on both forewings and hindwings ochraceous white in male, black in female. Underside ochraceous, suffused with a darker ochraceous on the tornal area of the hindwing. Forewings and hindwings transversely crossed by the following jet-black narrow bands. Forewing with basal, subbasal, inner and outer discal, postdiscal, subterminal and terminal bands; the inner discal band terminating on vein 1, the outer discal on vein 3; the postdiscal interrupted posteriorly on vein 2; the postdiscal and subterminal widened on the costa. Hindwing with a band along vein 1; basal and subbasal bands in continuation of those on the forewing, the latter turning upwards above tornus and continued to the base of the wing parallel to the dorsal margin; a discal band from costa to vein 3, a very slender postdiscal band from costa to dorsum, and closely approximate sub terminal and terminal bands; the postdiscal slender band or line twice interrupted across the tornal area; lobes black, narrowly edged with white on the outer side. Antennae dark brown annulated with white; head, thorax and abdomen dark brown; beneath, palpi, thorax and abdomen ochraceous white. 
Expanse: 43-47 mm
Habitat: Nepal; Sikkim over 5000 ft.,; Assam, the Khasi and Naga Hills; Upper Myanmar.

Subspecies
D. a. adonira Sikkim, Nepal, Sikkim, Northeast India (hills), North Burma
D. a. kala Tytler, 1940 Northeast Burma
D. a. naga Tytler, 1940  Naga Hills, Manipur, Assam
D. a. learmondi  Tytler, 1940  Shan States, Yunnan
D.a. argentea  Fruhstorfer, 1904  Burma
D. a. windu   Fruhstorfer, 1894  West Java

See also
Riodinidae
List of butterflies of India
List of butterflies of India (Riodinidae)

References
 
 

Dodona (butterfly)
Butterflies of Asia